The Oldershaw O-3 is an American high-wing, single seat, V-tailed glider that was designed by Vernon Oldershaw. Two examples were constructed as gliders and then both were later converted to motor gliders.

Design and development
The O-3 was designed by Oldershaw as an improved version of the O-2 to complete in the FAI Open Class. As such it had longer and higher aspect ratio wings of  span.

The O-3 first flew in June 1967.  It is constructed of wood, with the nose made from fibreglass. Its wing employs a Wortmann 61-184 airfoil at the wing root, with a Wortmann 60-126 at the wing tip. The wing is equipped with trailing edge dive brakes. The landing gear is a retractable monowheel.

Both aircraft were constructed as pure gliders and then later motorized with the addition of a twin-cylinder, in-line Yamaha snowmobile engine. The engine is mounted behind the wing spar on a pylon that retracts forward into a bay closed by two doors. The power is transmitted through a belt-drive to a two-bladed propeller. The pylon can be deployed in eight seconds and uses the electric motor from a Ford Thunderbird window winder.

Operational history

Oldershaw's O-3 was listed by the Federal Aviation Administration as destroyed and removed from the register in July 1999. The US Southwest Soaring Museum lists it as being part of their collection.

O-3 serial number 2 was built by Carlton Kibler of Porterville, California and officially registered as a Fry-Kibler O3A Renigade in 1979. In May 2011 the aircraft was still on the FAA registry.

Aircraft on display
US Southwest Soaring Museum

Specifications (O-3)

See also

References

External links
Photo of the second O-3
Photo of the second O-3

1960s United States sailplanes
Homebuilt aircraft
Aircraft first flown in 1967
V-tail aircraft
Shoulder-wing aircraft